Reestit mutton is a type of salted mutton traditional to the Shetland Islands, Scotland. It has been termed "Shetland's national dish"

Etymology 
The name reestit mutton comes from the Scots language word reest, meaning to cure by drying or smoking. A wooden framework, called a reest, was traditionally placed across the rafters of a building, from which the mutton would traditionally be hung to dry with the aid of smoke from a peat fire.

Origin 
Reestit mutton was traditionally prepared as a way of preserving mutton so that it could be eaten during winter. It is related to similar Scandinavian methods of drying meat, such as skerpikjøt. If prepared correctly reestit mutton can remain edible for up to four years.

Preparation 
Reestit mutton is prepared by soaking a leg or shoulder of mutton in brine. The correct ratio of coarse salt to water for the brine is achieved when a potato or egg will float in the solution. Some recipes also call for the addition of a small amount of sugar or saltpetre to the solution. The mutton is kept in the brine until the solution has reached all parts of the meat, which can take around three weeks. The meat is then hung to dry in proximity to a peat fire until the meat solidifies.

Flavour 
Reestit mutton has a salty flavour, which is also influenced by the peat smoke which it is exposed to when drying. The food is considered nostalgic by Shetlanders.

The first butcher to sell reestit mutton on a commercial basis in Lerwick, Shetland advertised it as having "an acquired taste that you acquire at the first taste".

Dishes 
Reestit mutton is commonly used as the basis for reestit mutton soup. The soup is made with tatties (potatoes), and is commonly served with bannocks - small savoury scone-like baked items. This dish is commonly associated with the Up Helly Aa fire festival. It can also be used as the filling of a reestit mutton pie.

References

Sources 

 
 
 
 
 
 
 

Shetland cuisine
Dried meat
Lamb dishes